A Blemish in the Great Light is the third studio album by the Canadian indie rock band Half Moon Run, released in 2019. The album peaked at #3 on the Canadian Albums Chart and won Adult Alternative Album of the Year at the Juno Awards of 2020.

Track listing 
All tracks written by Half Moon Run

Personnel

Half Moon Run
Devon Portielje
Dylan Phillips
Isaac Symonds
Conner Molander

Additional musicians
Quatuor Esca – string quartet
Colin Stetson – saxophone
Pietro Amato – French horn
Christopher Seligman – French horn
Chœur des enfants de Montréal - choir
Rowan Grace Mizerski – additional vocals

Production
Joe Chiccareli – producer, engineer
Nyles Spencer – engineer on "Undercurrents" and "Jello on My Mind"
Dylan Phillips – producer on "Undercurrents", string/choir/horn arrangements
Devon Portielje – bass saxophone arrangement on "Then Again"
Chris Shaw – mixing
Emily Lazar – mastering
Chris Allgood – mastering
Samuel Woywitka – engineer
Jacob Lacroix-Cardinal – engineer
Lars Fox – digital editting
Léa Moisan-Perrier – soprano, choir director
Ross Stirling — layout and design
Yani Clarke – photography
Isaac Symonds – back cover photo

References

2019 albums
Half Moon Run albums
Juno Award for Adult Alternative Album of the Year albums